The following is a list of secondary fictional characters from the science fiction media franchise Dune created by Frank Herbert. The characters listed originate in Herbert's novel series (1965–1985), but some also appear in the Prelude to Dune prequel series written by Herbert's son Brian Herbert and science fiction author Kevin J. Anderson.

Leto I Atreides

Leto I Atreides is the Duke of House Atreides, and father to Paul Atreides. He is introduced in Frank Herbert's 1965 novel Dune, and is later a primary character in the prequel trilogies Prelude to Dune (1999–2001) and the Caladan Trilogy (2020–2022) by Brian Herbert and Kevin J. Anderson. According to Brian Herbert, Frank Herbert's son and biographer, House Atreides was based on the heroic but ill-fated Greek mythological House Atreus.

Leto is portrayed by Jürgen Prochnow in David Lynch's 1984 film Dune, and by William Hurt in the 2000 Dune miniseries. Hurt was the first actor to be cast in the 2000 adaptation. A fan of the novel, he told The New York Times, "I was a science fiction junkie ... [Director John Harrison] captured Herbert's prophetic reflection of our own age, where nation-states are competing with the new global economy and its corporate elements." Leto is portrayed by Oscar Isaac in the 2021 Denis Villeneuve film Dune.

Emmet Asher-Perrin of Tor.com writes that Hurt "brings a certain reserved calm that works for the character."

Dune
Rising in influence among the Landsraad assembly of noble families, Duke Leto Atreides is given control of the lucrative planetary fief of Arrakis, which has previously been managed by House Atreides' longtime enemies, the Harkonnens. Arrakis—an inhospitable desert planet plagued by giant sandworms—is the only known source of melange, the valuable drug at the center of the galactic empire's economy. Leto suspects treachery on the part of Padishah Emperor Shaddam IV, but cannot refuse the assignment. Leto moves his entire household from his ocean homeworld Caladan to the desolate Arrakis, including his Bene Gesserit concubine Lady Jessica, his son and heir Paul, his Weapons Master Gurney Halleck, and his Mentat Thufir Hawat. With the help of his Ginaz Swordmaster Duncan Idaho, Leto reaches out to Arrakis' native Fremen, people tempered by the planet's harsh conditions who Leto realizes are an underestimated and untapped resource, a potential "desert power". The Baron Harkonnen launches an attack, his forces secretly bolstered by Shaddam's fierce Sardaukar warriors and aided by Leto's own trusted Suk doctor, Wellington Yueh. Coerced by the Baron to save his wife from torture, Yueh disables the shields of the Atreides fortress and delivers a drugged Leto to the Baron. Assuming his wife is already dead and seeking revenge against Harkonnen, Yueh provides Leto with a false tooth filled with poison gas. Leto bites down on the tooth in the Baron's presence, but the gas misses the Baron and only kills the Baron's twisted Mentat, Piter De Vries.

Thanks to supplies left by Yueh, Paul and Lady Jessica escape into the desert and find refuge with the Fremen. Paul ultimately binds the Fremen communities across the planet and leads them to take back their planet from Imperial rule. He names his first son Leto in honor of his father; after this child dies in infancy, Paul names his second son Leto II.

Prelude to Dune
In the Prelude to Dune prequel trilogy, young Leto is the son and heir to Duke Paulus Atreides of Caladan and his wife, the former Helena Richese. Having ruled Caladan for 26 generations, the Atreides are distantly related to the Imperial House Corrino through Helena's mother, and has feuded with House Harkonnen since the time of Vorian Atreides, founder of the family line. Paulus arranges for Leto to spend a portion of his adolescence on the industrial planet Ix in the care of Earl Dominic Vernius—over the objections of Helena, whose family are the business rivals of House Vernius. On Ix, Leto becomes fast friends with Dominic's son Rhombur, and falls in love with his daughter Kailea. When the Bene Tleilax invade and seize control of Ix (secretly aided by Padishah Emperor Elrood IX), the Vernius heirs flee to Caladan with Leto, and Dominic and Shando go off separately to pull attention from their children. Paulus, an expert bullfighter, is soon killed in the ring. Hoping to rule Caladan as regent through Leto, Helena had arranged for a Salusan bull to be drugged; realizing his mother's culpability, Leto exiles her to a distant convent to avoid the scandal of a public execution. Now the duke, Leto takes Kailea as his concubine, and they have a son named Victor. Obligated to keep open the possibility of a political marriage, Leto declines marrying Kailea or naming Victor as his heir. Leto and Kailea grow apart, and her resentment and insecurities build. After the arrival into his household of the Bene Gesserit acolyte Jessica, who Leto finds attractive, Kailea attempts to kill Leto. She fails, but in the ensuing accident her brother Rhombur is injured and her son Victor is killed. Kailea commits suicide. Leto and Jessica fall in love with one another, and she becomes his concubine, though they too do not wed in case an advantageous marriage alliance presents itself. Though instructed by the Bene Gesserit to bear the mourning Leto a daughter, Jessica intentionally conceives the son he desires. In 10,176 A.G., Jessica gives birth to their son Paul. Leto surrounds himself with loyal and capable individuals, and comes to be known as an effective politician, a fair and just statesman, and a capable leader of his small military. Elrood's son, the new Emperor Shaddam IV, both admires Leto, and dislikes him as a political rival. Framed by Baron Harkonnen for a crime aboard a heighliner, Leto subtly blackmails Shaddam into intervening on his behalf. Leto's military victory over the forces occupying Ix, and his role in the subsequent political censure of Shaddam, ensure Leto a vengeful enemy in the Emperor.

Daniel and Marty

Daniel and Marty are a pair of mysterious observers with advanced technological powers who are introduced in Frank Herbert's 1985 novel Chapterhouse: Dune. Herbert's 1986 death "left fans with an über-cliffhanger" for twenty years, until his son Brian Herbert and author Kevin J. Anderson published two sequels to the original series, Hunters of Dune (2006) and Sandworms of Dune (2007).

Chapterhouse Dune
In the final chapter of Chapterhouse Dune, a mysterious old man and woman calling themselves Daniel and Marty observe the escape of the no-ship from Chapterhouse. They speak of themselves as Face Dancers, the shapeshifting minions of the Tleilaxu:

Daniel and Marty hint that they observe and are familiar with various groups in the universe, and allude to their desire to capture and study the passengers of the no-ship. As to their motive, Marty says, "Gather up enough people and you get a big ball of knowledge, Daniel!" Earlier, Duncan Idaho had seen the observers in a vision, and came to his own conclusions:

With the subsequent death of Frank Herbert in 1986, the identities, motives and intentions of Daniel and Marty were left to speculation.

Sequels
In 2006's Hunters of Dune, Daniel and Marty are in constant pursuit of the escaped no-ship Ithaca, on which they believe is the Kwisatz Haderach they require to be victorious in the imminent and long-foretold "battle at the end of the universe" known as kralizec. Their Face Dancer minion Khrone is executing a parallel plan to create their own Kwisatz Haderach, using a Paul Atreides ghola that will be conditioned by a ghola of the Baron Harkonnen. Daniel and Marty themselves have the ability to create illusions, and to inflict pain on any human. At the end of Hunters of Dune, it is revealed that Daniel and Marty are not, in fact, Face Dancers: they are actually incarnations of the thinking machines Omnius (Daniel) and Erasmus (Marty), introduced in the Legends of Dune prequel trilogy (2002–2004) by Brian Herbert and Anderson. In the third Legends novel Dune: The Battle of Corrin (2004), Omnius had sent out a last blast of information before being destroyed in the Battle of Corrin. It is explained in Hunters that this signal had eventually connected with one of the probes disseminated from Giedi Prime several years earlier, uploading versions of Erasmus and Omnius.

In Sandworms of Dune (2007), Omnius and Erasmus finally capture the no-ship and pit the Paul ghola on board against their own twisted version, Paolo, in a duel to the death that will leave them with the strongest of the two. Paul survives, but realizes that Duncan is actually the "ultimate Kwisatz Haderach" that Omnius has been seeking. The Oracle of Time, the immortal founder of the Spacing Guild, transports every aspect of the Omnius network into another dimension forever. Erasmus offers Duncan the choice between continuing their war or ending it; Duncan chooses peace over victory, and he and Erasmus merge minds. Erasmus imparts Duncan with all the codes required to run the Synchronized Worlds, as well as all of Erasmus' knowledge, setting Duncan as the bridge between humans and machines to permanently end the divide and ensure that the two may co-exist. With little left for him, Erasmus again expresses his desire to learn everything possible about what it is to be human—and asks Duncan to deactivate him so that he may experience "death".

Analysis
William F. Touponce states unequivocally that Daniel and Marty are Face Dancers in his 1988 book Frank Herbert:

In an August 2007 review of Sandworms of Dune, John C. Snider of SciFiDimensions.com argues that it "doesn't fit" or "add up" that Frank Herbert's Daniel and Marty are the "malevolent" thinking machines Brian Herbert and Anderson created in their Legends of Dune prequel novels. He further wonders why "Omnius, long established as puzzled by and averse to human unpredictability, would want to breed that ultimate ungovernable—a Kwisatz Haderach".

Farad'n

Farad'n  of House Corrino is the grandson of Padishah Emperor Shaddam IV by his daughter, the Princess Wensicia. He appears in Frank Herbert's 1976 novel Children of Dune, and his infancy is chronicled in the 2008 prequel Paul of Dune by Brian Herbert and Kevin J. Anderson.

Farad'n is portrayed by Jonathan Brüün in the 2003 miniseries Frank Herbert's Children of Dune.

Children of Dune
In Children of Dune, Farad'n is the grandson and heir to the deposed 81st Padishah Emperor Shaddam IV; his mother is Shaddam's third daughter Princess Wensicia, and his deceased father Dalak is noted to be related to Count Hasimir Fenring, a close friend of Shaddam's since childhood. Shaddam and most of his family are exiled to Salusa Secundus after he is deposed by Paul Atreides in Dune (1965).

As the novel begins, Shaddam is dead and Wensicia plots from exile to restore House Corrino to its former glory and wrest control of the Empire for Farad'n. She attempts to assassinate twins Leto II and Ghanima Atreides, Paul's heirs, by sending mechanically controlled Laza tigers to hunt them in the desert. Leto's growing prescience allows him to thwart the attack, but he pretends to be dead to escape the increasingly murderous ambitions of his father's sister Alia. Farad'n—newly trained in the Bene Gesserit ways by Paul and Alia's mother Lady Jessica—accepts an arrangement brokered by Jessica for him to marry Ghanima and share the throne; his part of the deal is to "denounce and banish" Wensicia for Leto's murder attempt, which he does. Leto reappears, now beginning the transformation into a human-sandworm hybrid, and ascends the throne himself. Leto, who is now physically incapable of siring children, commands Farad'n to father the future Atreides line as Ghanima's mate. Farad'n is also appointed as the Royal Scribe and renamed "Harq al'Ada" (the "breaker of habit"), and relinquishes his control of the Sardaukar to Leto, effectively surrendering House Corrino's claim to the Imperial throne.

Many of the chapter epigraphs in the novel are from the later writings of Farad'n (as Harq al'Ada) in his role as chronicler of the reign of Leto II.

Thufir Hawat

Thufir Hawat is a fictional character in the Dune universe created by Frank Herbert. He primarily appears in the 1965 novel Dune, but also in the Prelude to Dune prequel trilogy (1999–2001) by Brian Herbert and Kevin J. Anderson. The character is brought back as a ghola in the Herbert/Anderson sequels which conclude the original series, Hunters of Dune (2006) and Sandworms of Dune (2007).

Dune
In Dune, Hawat is the Mentat Master of Assassins who has served House Atreides for multiple generations, until Duke Leto Atreides is killed by a Harkonnen attack. Hawat himself is captured by the Imperial Sardaukar during the attack and acquired by the Baron Vladimir Harkonnen through subterfuge.

Baron Vladimir Harkonnen, recognizing good talent and seeking a replacement for his late Mentat Piter De Vries, wishes to utilize Hawat's immense abilities. Calculating that Hawat would direct his efforts for revenge towards the Imperium instead of House Harkonnen, the Baron manages to enlist Hawat into his service while secretly making him chemically dependent on an antidote to a permanent latent poison developed by Piter De Vries and administered to Hawat in his food after his capture. The Baron, himself a dangerous intellect, also keeps Hawat's abilities in check by feeding him false data, specifically, permitting him to believe that Lady Jessica had been the traitor responsible for the Atreides' destruction.

In spite of these immense obstacles, Hawat very nearly brings down the Harkonnens from within. The Baron's nephew and heir Feyd-Rautha attempts to fight a drugged slave to impress the onlooking Count Fenring and his wife Lady Margot. Hawat arranges for Feyd to confront a trained Atreides soldier with his capacities fully intact, his plan being to discredit the Harkonnen slavemaster and replace him with someone loyal to Feyd. This later leads to an assassination attempt on the Baron, as Hawat encourages the ambitions of Feyd against his uncle. One of the Baron's male slave lovers is implanted with a poison needle; the Baron, warned by Hawat, eludes the attempt on his life and forces Feyd to personally kill every female slave in the pleasure houses.

At the conclusion of the novel, Hawat is coerced to assassinate Leto's son, Paul Atreides. Paul suspects this, but out of gratitude to Hawat's exceptional loyalty, Paul gives him the opportunity to take anything Hawat wishes of him, even his life. Hawat chooses death rather than to betray Paul.

Chapterhouse: Dune
In 1985's Chapterhouse: Dune, the last Tleilaxu Master Scytale is revealed to have a nullentropy capsule embedded in his chest, containing cells from many important past figures, including Hawat.

Hunters of Dune
In the Brian Herbert and Kevin J. Anderson's Hunters of Dune (2006), the aging Scytale reveals the existence of the capsule to his Bene Gesserit captors out of desperation, and offers to assist in the production of gholas in exchange for a ghola of his own body. The venerable warrior-Mentat Hawat is one of the resurrected. He has a deep admiration for Miles Teg, a warrior-Mentat himself.

Liet-Kynes

Liet-Kynes is the Imperial Planetologist of the desert planet Arrakis. He primarily appears in Frank Herbert's 1965 novel Dune, but also in the Prelude to Dune prequel trilogy (1999–2001) by Brian Herbert and Kevin J. Anderson. The character is brought back as a ghola in Hunters of Dune (2006) and Sandworms of Dune (2007), the Herbert/Anderson sequels which conclude the original series.

Liet-Kynes is portrayed by Max von Sydow in David Lynch's 1984 film Dune, by Karel Dobrý in the 2000 Dune miniseries, and by Sharon Duncan-Brewster in the 2021 Denis Villeneuve film Dune.

Dune
In Dune, Duke Leto Atreides meets with Dr. Kynes, the Imperial Planetologist, soon after arriving on Arrakis to take over the melange harvesting operations there. Escorted by the planet's native Fremen, Kynes is the liaison between them and the Padishah Empire. The Atreides later hear of a person or deity named "Liet" to whom all the Fremen communities give allegiance. It is only after Leto is killed and his son Paul and concubine Lady Jessica flee into the desert that Liet and Kynes are revealed to be the same person. The son of Pardot Kynes, the first Imperial Planetologist of Arrakis, and a Fremen woman, Kynes is captured by the Harkonnens and left to die in the desert without a stillsuit or water. He is killed by a spice blow, and his last words are, "I am a desert creature!" His daughter, Chani, later becomes Paul's concubine.

Liet-Kynes's wife and Chani's mother is later identified as Faroula, "a noted herbalist among the Fremen".

Prelude to Dune
Liet-Kynes's origin as the son of Pardot and the Fremen woman Frieth is explored in the Prelude to Dune prequel trilogy. Frieth is the sister of Stilgar, a future leader of Sietch Tabr. Growing up under Fremen tradition, Liet inherits his father's position as planetologist as well as his secret goal of terraforming Arrakis into a temperate planet.

Lucilla

Lucilla is a Bene Gesserit Reverend Mother and Imprinter. She appears in Frank Herbert's novels Heretics of Dune (1984) and Chapterhouse: Dune (1985).

Heretics of Dune
In Heretics of Dune, Reverend Mother Lucilla is a young, attractive Bene Gesserit Imprinter sent by Mother Superior Taraza to Gammu. Lucilla is tasked to teach the Duncan Idaho ghola the Sisterhood is raising there and bind his loyalty to her through imprinting, while also protecting him from the negative influence—and possible danger—presented by dissenting Bene Gesserit who believe the ghola is a danger to the Sisterhood. Extremely precocious and already having divined the fact that he is a ghola, the young Duncan nurses hatred for the Bene Gesserit, hoping to escape their control of his life. He soon blossoms, however, under the training of Lucilla and Bashar Miles Teg, brought out of retirement in part to protect the ghola. An attempt is made on Duncan's life, and Teg and Lucilla flee with Duncan into the countryside. They hide in a forgotten Harkonnen no-globe, in which Teg uses his strong resemblance to Duke Leto I Atreides (the original Idaho's master) and a variety of relentless physical and mental attacks to awaken Duncan to his original memories. This occurs before Lucilla has imprinted the ghola, and his new self-awareness now makes it impossible for her to attempt it.

During their extraction, Teg and his companions are ambushed, and Teg sacrifices himself to capture while Lucilla and Duncan escape with Teg's protégé Burzmali. Duncan attempts to get off Gammu undetected in the guise of a Tleilaxu Master, but is taken hostage. Lucilla and Burzmali arrive at a Bene Gesserit safe house, but discover that it has been taken over by the Honored Matres. Lucilla manages to impersonate an Honored Matre as one of their number, Murbella, proceeds to seduce the captured Duncan with the Honored Matre imprinting technique. The attempt triggers Tleilaxu conditioning hidden within Duncan, and he responds with an equal technique that overwhelms Murbella in sexual pleasure and drains her energy. Taking advantage of Murbella's post-coital exhaustion, Lucilla knocks her unconscious. Escaping, Teg captures a no-ship and locates Duncan and Lucilla, and they flee with the captured Murbella as their prisoner.

Chapterhouse Dune
By the start of Chapterhouse: Dune, Lucilla has been transferred to the planet Lampadas in order to oversee a Bene Gesserit education center located there. She manages to escape before the Honored Matres destroy the planet, carrying the shared memories of its millions of Reverend Mothers. Her ship is damaged by a mine and she is forced to land on Gammu, where she takes refuge with a hidden colony of Jews, knowing that they will be sympathetic to her. The Jews had fled Earth thousands of years earlier in order to escape relentless persecution; they now practice their religion in secret to maintain their ties to ancient history. The Bene Gesserit, with their own method of connecting to their past, have cultivated a relationship with the Jews. The leader of this settlement gives Lucilla shelter, but ultimately has to turn her over to the Honored Matres in order to save his people from destruction at their hands. Before doing so, however, he introduces Lucilla to Rebecca, a "wild" Reverend Mother who has gained her Other Memories without Bene Gesserit training. Lucilla shares minds with Rebecca, who promises to take the memories of Lampadas safely back to the Sisterhood.

The Honored Matres capture Lucilla and bring her before the Great Honored Matre Dama, who surprises everyone present by declining to kill her outright. Dama offers to let Lucilla join the group in exchange for learning the secrets of the Bene Gesserit, including their methods for altering their biochemistry. Her remarks prompt Lucilla to speculate that the Honored Matres were driven out of The Scattering by an enemy who used biological weapons. After several days of interrogation, Dama eventually becomes furious over Lucilla's description of the ideals taught by the Bene Gesserit, such as democracy, and kills her.

Murbella

Murbella is a young Honored Matre who eventually joins the Bene Gesserit. She appears primarily in Frank Herbert's novels Heretics of Dune (1984) and Chapterhouse: Dune (1985) but also in Hunters of Dune (2006) and Sandworms of Dune (2007), Brian Herbert and Kevin J. Anderson's sequel novels that complete Frank Herbert's original series.

Heretics of Dune
Murbella is a young Honored Matre who attempts to imprint the Bene Gesserit-loyal Duncan Idaho ghola in Heretics of Dune. She finds that the Tleilaxu have secretly programmed him with the male equivalent of the sexual powers used by the Honored Matres to enslave men. Murbella and Duncan imprint each other, and in her weakened condition Murbella is easily captured by the Bene Gesserit. Her new addiction to Duncan keeps Murbella subdued, and Bene Gesserit soon begin to train her as one of them, though they do not completely trust her.

Chapterhouse Dune
In Chapterhouse: Dune, Duncan and Murbella's mutual imprinting has made them reluctant lovers. Murbella collapses under the pressure of training and her pregnancy, but realizes that she admires and wants to be Bene Gesserit. Murbella submits to the spice agony to become a Bene Gesserit Reverend Mother and survives. During a Bene Gesserit attack on the Honored Matres, Murbella kills the Great Honored Matre Logno with her Bene Gesserit-enhanced fighting skills, and the Honored Matres are awed by her physical prowess. The Bene Gesserit Mother Superior Darwi Odrade is also killed, and Murbella secures the leadership of both groups, per Odrade's plan. Murbella intends to merge the two orders into a New Sisterhood, which displeases some of the Bene Gesserit. The dissenters flee Chapterhouse with Duncan, Miles Teg, and Sheeana in a giant no-ship, and Murbella realizes their plan too late to stop them.

Sequels
In the Brian Herbert/Kevin J. Anderson sequel Hunters of Dune (2006), Murbella takes the title Mother Commander. She has four daughters by Duncan: Rinya, Janess, Tanidia, and Gianne. Murbella searches her Other Memory for the origin of the Honored Matres. She discovers that they are descendants of Tleilaxu females originally used as axlotl tanks, freed by Fish Speakers and rogue Bene Gesserits who allied in The Scattering. Murbella also discovers that the Honored Matres' "outside enemy" are thinking machines, provoked when the Honored Matres stole technologically advanced weapons, including Obliterators, from them. In the Brian Herbert/Kevin J. Anderson sequel Sandworms of Dune (2007), Murbella now knows that the sentient computer network Omnius and his thinking machine forces are coming, and attempts to rally humankind for a last stand against the thinking machines. She commissions the scientists of Ix to copy the destructive Obliterators for use on the fleet of warships she has ordered from the Spacing Guild. However, Ix is now secretly controlled by Face Dancer leader Khrone. When Murbella is ready to launch her fleet, the Obliterators and Ixian navigation devices all suddenly fail, which Murbella realizes is sabotage. The Oracle of Time appears, destroying Omnius and the thinking machines with her own armada. Murbella is reunited with Duncan, who intends to end the divide between humans and thinking machines, allowing the two to co-exist.

Glossu Rabban

Glossu Rabban (also known as Beast Rabban) is the violent and sadistic nephew of the Baron Vladimir Harkonnen. He appears primarily in Frank Herbert's 1965 novel Dune, but also in the Prelude to Dune prequel trilogy (1999–2001) by Brian Herbert and Kevin J. Anderson.

Dune
Herbert writes in "Appendix IV: The Almanak of en-Ashraf (Selected Excerpts of the Noble Houses)" in Dune:

In the novel, Glossu Rabban is the older nephew of the Baron Harkonnen. He is as cruel and sadistic as his uncle, but lacks the Baron's intelligence. The Baron tasks Rabban to rule the planet Arrakis for a time in the most brutal way possible, so that when his favored nephew Feyd-Rautha takes over, Feyd will be welcomed as a hero by the populace. After the Baron seizes the planet back from Atreides control, Rabban tells his uncle that the Harkonnens have woefully underestimated both the numbers and threat of the Fremen population there. Known as "the Beast Rabban" on Arrakis for his aggression and cruelty, his Fremen nickname is "Mudir Nahya", which translates as "Demon Ruler" or "King Cobra". Rabban is killed by the Fremen and the people of Arrakeen when Paul "Muad'Dib" Atreides retakes Arrakis using Fremen forces. However, in the 1984 movie adaptation, he is executed by the Padishah Emperor Shaddam IV. Rabban's severed head is shown to the Baron Harkonnen as the Emperor scolds him for assigning to his nephew the governorship of Arrakis.

Travis Johnson of Flicks.com.au describes Rabban as "the Baron's murderous and notably less Machiavellian nephew". Noting that the characters in Dune fit mythological archetypes, novelist Brian Herbert, Frank Herbert's son and biographer, writes that "Beast Rabban Harkonnen, though evil and aggressive, is essentially a fool."

Prelude to Dune
In the Prelude to Dune prequel trilogy, Rabban kills Duncan Idaho's parents and Gurney Halleck's sister. He earns his nickname "Beast" when he strangles his own father.

Merchandising
When in 1984 toy company LJN released a line of Dune action figures, styled after David Lynch's film, the collection included a figure of Rabban.

Reverend Mother Ramallo

Reverend Mother Ramallo is a spiritual leader among the Fremen of the desert planet Arrakis, a "wild" version of a Bene Gesserit Reverend Mother. She appears primarily in Frank Herbert's 1965 novel Dune, but also in the Prelude to Dune prequel trilogy (1999–2001) by Brian Herbert and Kevin J. Anderson.

Ramallo is portrayed by Italian actress Silvana Mangano in David Lynch's 1984 film Dune, and by Drahomíra Fialková in the 2000 Dune miniseries. A younger version of Ramallo was played by Petra Kulíková in this TV adaptation.

Dune
In Dune, Paul Atreides and his mother Lady Jessica flee a Harkonnen attack and find refuge among the Fremen of Sietch Tabr. Jessica soon realizes that their Reverend Mother Ramallo is a "wild" version of the Bene Gesserit equivalent. When Ramallo knows her own end is near, she subjects Jessica to the ritual spice agony to make her Ramallo's replacement. The Fremen ordeal to become a Reverend Mother involves ingesting the poisonous Water of Life. Jessica survives and shares minds with Ramallo, acquiring the older woman's life experiences and collective Other Memory, and then Ramallo dies.

Prelude to Dune
In Dune: House Harkonnen (2000), the second novel of the Prelude to Dune prequel trilogy set before the events of Dune, Bene Gesserit Lady Margot Fenring seeks out the Fremen on Arrakis, looking for a group of Bene Gesserit sisters (including Ramallo) who had been sent there to assess the Missionaria Protectiva but who had never returned. The following quote is attributed to Ramallo via an epigraph in Dune: House Harkonnen:

Scytale

Scytale  is a Tleilaxu Face Dancer who participates in the conspiracy to topple the rule of Paul Atreides in Frank Herbert's 1969 novel Dune Messiah.  He later returns as a ghola and Tleilaxu Master in Heretics of Dune (1984) and Chapterhouse: Dune (1985). Scytale's story continues in Hunters of Dune (2006) and Sandworms of Dune (2007), Brian Herbert and Kevin J. Anderson's sequel novels that complete Frank Herbert's original series.

The character is portrayed by Martin McDougall in the 2003 miniseries Frank Herbert's Children of Dune.

Dune Messiah
In Dune Messiah (1969), Tleilaxu Face Dancer Scytale is involved with the Guild Navigator Edric, Bene Gesserit Reverend Mother Gaius Helen Mohiam, and Princess Irulan of House Corrino (the consort of Emperor Paul Atreides) in a plot planned by Scytale himself to force Paul from the throne through assassination or abdication. Unlike later Face Dancers presented in the series, Scytale appears autonomous, and his high-level dealings with the other conspirators suggest a certain rank and level of trust among the Tleilaxu. Scytale notes of Face Dancers, "We are Jadacha hermaphrodites ... either sex at will." He subsequently kills and assumes the appearance of Lichna, the daughter of the trusted Fremen Otheym, in order to gain entrance to the Atreides Keep at Arrakeen and lure Paul out to Otheym's house, where Scytale has planted an atomic weapon. The attack fails to kill Paul, but the atomic blast blinds him. Scytale soon makes an attempt to force Paul's allegiance. With the Tleilaxu ghola of Duncan Idaho having regained the memories of the deceased original, Scytale has proven that the Tleilaxu can resurrect a human being. He offers Paul a ghola of his concubine Chani, who has just died giving birth to their twin children Leto II and Ghanima, in exchange for Paul surrendering his Empire to Tleilaxu control. Though tempted, Paul refuses. Scytale holds a knife over the newborn twins; unless Paul accepts, he will kill them instantly. Paul instead kills Scytale with a thrown crysknife, guided by a vision sent by his infant son.

Heretics of Dune
A Tleilaxu Master named Scytale is mentioned in Heretics of Dune (1984), 5000 years after the events of Dune Messiah. He is one of Tleilaxu leader Waff's nine councillors, and apparently a ghola of the original Scytale:

Though Herbert notes little about Tleilaxu Masters prior to Heretics, the novel establishes that after learning how to restore a ghola's memories in Dune Messiah, the Masters use this knowledge as a form of immortality. As in God Emperor of Dune (1981), Face Dancers are Tleilaxu servants rather than emissaries. Herbert does not explain how the Scytale of Messiah—a Face Dancer, though autonomous—could ascend to become a Master, or how the Master/Face Dancer relationship may have evolved over the millennia.

Chapterhouse Dune
In Chapterhouse Dune (1985), the Honored Matres have destroyed all of the Tleilaxu worlds in retaliation for the Tleilaxu role in programming the latest Duncan Idaho ghola with knowledge of how to sexually enslave Honored Matres. Scytale, likely the last surviving Tleilaxu Master, barely escapes the attack while leaving his homeworld and is given sanctuary by the Bene Gesserit. Essentially a prisoner, he is kept in a no-ship grounded on the secret Bene Gesserit planet Chapterhouse. In exchange for their protection, Scytale has given the Bene Gesserit the knowledge to create axlotl tanks to grow their own gholas. Desiring his own Face Dancer servants, axlotl tanks, and access to the ship's systems, Scytale has held back the secret to creating artificial melange for future negotiations. His secret bargaining chip is a nullentropy capsule containing cells carefully and covertly collected by the Tleilaxu for millennia:

Bene Gesserit leader Darwi Odrade notes that "Scytale admits to memories of Muad'Dib's times," and Herbert clarifies that Scytale is technically a clone, as the cells used to resurrect him had been taken from his living predecessor rather than a corpse. There is no indication in the text that this "reincarnated" Scytale possesses any of the Face Dancer abilities of his Dune Messiah incarnation.

Sequels
In Hunters of Dune (2006), Scytale remains a prisoner on the no-ship, which has escaped the Bene Gesserit planet Chapterhouse and wanders in deep space. He is desperate; the Tleilaxu sustain their lives indefinitely through the use of gholas; his current body is slowly dying, and he does not have another to replace it. Needing to grow a new ghola of himself, his only bargaining tool is the secret nullentropy capsule. It is noted that other cells in Scytale's possession include those of Duke Leto Atreides, Lady Jessica, Leto II and other legendary figures dating back to Serena Butler and Xavier Harkonnen from the Butlerian Jihad. The Bene Gesserit debate whether to create gholas of any of these historical figures, and despite the controversy, gholas are created a few at a time. Scytale is allowed to have his own once the first few have been born.

In Sandworms of Dune (2007), Scytale finally reawakens his own ghola's past memories using the trauma of watching the elder Scytale die in front of his younger self. Sheeana and the Orthodox Bene Gesserit Sisterhood establish a new home on Synchrony, and with Scytale's assistance have reestablished the ancient Bene Gesserit breeding program. Along with gholas of the Tleilaxu Masters, Scytale has grown Tleilaxu females from newly discovered cells, vowing that they will never again be forced into becoming axlotl tanks, in the hopes that this will prevent the creation of a vengeful enemy such as the Honored Matres from ever occurring again, and also vowing to never again allow the Masters to corrupt the recovering Tleilaxu people.

Stilgar

Stilgar is the leader of Sietch Tabr, a Fremen community on the desert planet Arrakis. He appears in Frank Herbert's novels Dune (1965), Dune Messiah (1969) and Children of Dune (1976). The character's early life is explored in the Prelude to Dune prequel trilogy (1999–2001) by Brian Herbert and Kevin J. Anderson, and he returns in the form of a ghola in the Herbert/Anderson conclusion to the original series, Sandworms of Dune (2007). Stilgar also appears in the prequels Paul of Dune (2008) and The Winds of Dune (2009).

Novelist Brian Herbert, Frank Herbert's son and biographer, writes, "One time I asked my father if he identified with any of the characters in his stories, and to my surprise he said it was Stilgar, the rugged leader of the Fremen ... Mulling this over, I realized Stilgar was the equivalent of a Native American chief in Dune—a person who represented and defended time-honored ways that did not harm the ecology of the planet."

Stilgar is portrayed by Everett McGill in David Lynch's 1984 film Dune, by Uwe Ochsenknecht in the 2000 Dune miniseries, and by Steven Berkoff in the 2003 sequel miniseries Children of Dune. Stilgar is portrayed by Javier Bardem in the 2021 Denis Villeneuve film Dune.

Emmet Asher-Perrin of Tor.com called Ochsenknecht "a wonderfully gruff Stilgar", but later wrote, "Steven Berkoff is an incredible character actor, but there is nothing about him that even remotely invokes the old Fremen leader. Instead, he reads at the beginning like the Atreides family butler before moving onto Old British Wardog Supreme."

Original series
In the 1965 novel Dune, Paul Atreides and his mother Lady Jessica flee into the desert of Arrakis to escape a Harkonnen attack. Stilgar is the leader of Sietch Tabr, a Fremen community in which Paul and Jessica seek refuge. Stilgar has two wives; the first is Tharthar, and he later also marries Harah. Stilgar and his people eventually come to believe that Paul is their long-foretold messiah, the Mahdi. Paul leads them in taking back their planet from under Imperial control, and Paul becomes Emperor.

Subsequently, in Dune Messiah (1969), Stilgar is a staunch supporter and protector of Paul, and one of his inner circle of advisors which includes Paul's concubine Chani, his wife Princess Irulan and his sister Alia. At the end of Messiah, Stilgar executes the Bene Gesserit Reverend Mother Gaius Helen Mohiam and Spacing Guild Navigator Edric on Alia's orders, after their conspiracy to topple Paul's empire fails. In Children of Dune (1976), Stilgar has asserted his protection over Paul and Chani's orphaned children, Leto II and Ghanima. Later, with Leto presumed dead, Stilgar helps Ghanima and Irulan escape Alia's tyranny.

Prelude to Dune
The Prelude to Dune prequel trilogy establishes that Stilgar Ben Fifrawi had been born on Arrakis in 10,141 A.G. in Umbu Sietch of Tuan. Among the members of Umbu Sietch, he is known as Sahkan or "the Desert Hawk". In his youth, Stilgar and two friends, Turok and Ommun, are cornered by thuggish Harkonnen troops. Badly injured, Stilgar would have died if Pardot Kynes had not come and helped kill the Harkonnens. Because of this water-debt, Stilgar and Kynes become friends. Stilgar, Turok and Ommun promise to help Kynes achieve his dream of turning Arrakis into a paradise. In 10,175 A.G. Stilgar challenges Forad, the leader of Sietch Tabr, and defeats him to become the new leader. When Kynes dies, Stilgar watches over his son Liet-Kynes, and later Liet's daughter Chani.

Merchandising
When in 1984 toy company LJN released a line of Dune action figures, styled after David Lynch's film, the collection included a figure of Stilgar.

Miles Teg

Miles Teg, the former Supreme Bashar of the Bene Gesserit, appears primarily in Frank Herbert's novels Heretics of Dune (1984) and Chapterhouse: Dune (1985), but also in Hunters of Dune (2006) and Sandworms of Dune (2007), Brian Herbert and Kevin J. Anderson's sequel novels that complete Frank Herbert's original series.

Description
In Heretics of Dune (1984), Miles Teg, the former Supreme Bashar of the Bene Gesserit, is noted to be 296 standard years old, and to have a striking resemblance to his ancestor, Leto I Atreides. The son of the Bene Gesserit Lady Janet Roxbrough of Lernaeus (a Fish Speaker descendant) and Loschy Teg, a "CHOAM station factor" chosen for breeding by the Sisterhood for his "gene potential," Miles Teg had been instructed in the Bene Gesserit ways by his mother before being sent to Lampadas to train as a Mentat, a human computer.

Teg is a military genius, having a very strong sense of honor, loyalty, and many of the characteristics of House Atreides, his ancestors. He is well known for doing the unexpected. Teg is also not a melange addict (unlike most other people), not even resorting to the spice at old age when most others might wish to extend their lives.

By the time of the novel, Teg's wife had been dead for 38 years, his grown children living elsewhere except for his eldest daughter Dimela. She and her husband Firus take control of Teg's farm when he leaves Lernaeus; the couple have three children. Teg had a younger brother, Sabine, who had been poisoned on Romo. During the events of Heretics of Dune, it is revealed that Teg had fathered other children during his younger years, and he discovers that Reverend Mother Darwi Odrade is one of them.

Heretics of Dune
In Heretics of Dune, Bene Gesserit Mother Superior Taraza seeks out a retired Teg at his family home on the planet Lernaeus in hopes he will agree to take over the weapons training of the newest Duncan Idaho ghola. Later, on the planet Gammu, the Bene Gesserit Keep is stormed by the Bene Tleilax, and Teg, the Idaho ghola and Reverend Mother Lucilla escape into hiding in a long-forgotten Harkonnen no-globe discovered by Teg's aide, Patrin. He awakens Idaho's original memories and arranges to be rescued by his favorite student, Burzmali. They are intercepted, and Teg stays behind, giving Lucilla and Idaho time to attempt escape. Teg is then captured by the Honored Matres.

Teg is tortured by the Honored Matres using a T-Probe; under the severe stress and agony produced by the probe's attempts to gain control of his body and his knowledge, his Mentat abilities and Atreides genes elevate him to a higher level of being. He is able to move faster than the eye can see by accelerating his metabolism, and he gains mild prescience, which he describes as a doubled vision which gives him intimations of danger. His accelerated speed comes at the cost of incredible energy expenditure, requiring him to consume enormous amounts of food. After escaping his captors, he finds that his safe-house had been taken over by Honored Matres, who attempt to gain his allegiance. Seeing the terrible state their constant drive for power and contempt for the masses has lowered them to, he uses his incredible speed to slaughter them and escape once more. At the end of the book, he gathers a force of veterans who had served under him on previous campaigns from the bars of Ysai (formerly Barony) and manages to capture a no-ship from the Scattering using his tactical genius and new abilities. He takes the ship to Rakis to meet up with Bene Gesserits Sheeana and Odrade. The vast slaughter he had inflicted on the Honored Matres provokes an immense reaction from them; they destroy Rakis using Obliterators, turning the entire planet into a charred ball in order to be certain of killing him.

Chapterhouse Dune
At the beginning of Chapterhouse: Dune (1985), a ghola of Teg is birthed on orders from his daughter, Odrade, who is now Mother Superior of the Bene Gesserit after Taraza's death at the end of Heretics of Dune. Odrade needs Teg's military abilities to thwart the worsening threat of the Honored Matres. The Bene Gesserit later reawaken him to his full memories prematurely by using Sheeana to imprint him. As the original Teg has been trained by his mother to resist such manipulation, the attempt subjects the Teg ghola to a heightened amount of stress which also unlocks the superhuman abilities acquired by Teg under Honored Matre torture in Heretics of Dune. A reawakened Teg leads the final assault upon the Honored Matres, but is captured when the Matres pretend to surrender. Murbella, a captive Honored Matre indoctrinated into the Bene Gesserit, kills the Honored Matre leader Logno as Bene Gesserit Mother Superior Odrade is killed, and Murbella manages to secure the leadership of both groups. Teg is released, later joining Sheeana and Duncan Idaho when they escape Bene Gesserit control in a no-ship.

Sequels
In Brian Herbert and Kevin J. Anderson's Hunters of Dune (2006), Duncan and Teg run the affairs on the no-ship—now named the Ithaca—being the only two passengers with experience in military leadership. Teg considers himself responsible for the security of the Ithaca and its vital cargo of historical gholas (including those of Teg's own ancestors Paul Atreides and Lady Jessica), produced in transit from genetic material possessed by captive passenger Scytale, purportedly the last Tleilaxu Master.

In Sandworms of Dune (2007), mysterious saboteurs conduct crippling attacks on the no-ship's systems, and Teg suspects that Face Dancers had infiltrated the ship during their escape from the planet of the Handlers in Hunters of Dune. Teg, Duncan, and the unawakened ghola of Thufir Hawat set about tightening the ship's security and hunting for the traitor; they are unsuccessful, and the unborn ghola of Duke Leto Atreides is killed while still gestating in an axlotl tank. Later Teg is shocked to discover that the Thufir ghola he had been training is a Face Dancer substitute. The other Face Dancer is revealed to have replaced the Rabbi, who before he is killed manages to lead the Ithaca to the Unknown Enemy who have been stalking the ship for years.

Caught in the Enemy's tachyon net and critically damaged, the Ithaca is trapped. Duncan sees a way to escape, but the ship is too damaged to do so; Teg decides to use his accelerated metabolism to repair the Ithaca. In mere moments—a period of weeks for Teg's body, in his accelerated time—Teg succeeds in repairing the ship and launches countermeasures against the attacking thinking machines. To sustain himself through this ordeal, he consumes vast quantities of melange and carbohydrates from the ship's stores. Teg returns to the bridge with only the strength to notify Duncan of the changes. His effort having resulted in massive cellular exhaustion, Teg collapses dead. Duncan's final attempt to escape the net fails, and the ship is brought back to the machine world Synchrony. En route, Duncan and Sheeana release the husk that is left of Teg's body into space, vowing that the Bashar will never be captured by the Enemy. Later, after the machines are defeated, Duncan asks Scytale for a new ghola of Teg, whom he'll need at his side in his new position as ruler of both mankind and machines.

Tylwyth Waff

Tylwyth Waff is the leader of the Bene Tleilax, a secretive race of genetic manipulators who traffic in biological products such as artificial eyes, gholas, and "twisted" Mentats. He is a major character in Frank Herbert's Heretics of Dune (1984) and Chapterhouse: Dune (1985). His story continues in Hunters of Dune (2006) and Sandworms of Dune (2007), Brian Herbert and Kevin J. Anderson's sequel novels that complete Frank Herbert's original series.

In Heretics of Dune, Herbert describes Waff as "an elfin figure barely a meter and a half tall. Eyes, hair, and skin were shades of gray, all a stage for the oval face with its tiny mouth and line of sharp teeth".

Original series
In Heretics of Dune, Waff successfully replaces High Priest Tuek with a Face Dancer, a genetically-engineered Tleilaxu servant with the ability to mimic any human. He loses control of the duplicate, however, due to its eventual complete assimilation into its new form.  Traveling to Rakis, Waff decides to ally with the Bene Gesserit after he is tricked into believing that they share the secret religious beliefs of the Tleilaxu. He is killed along with the entire population of Rakis when the Honored Matres destroy the planet in revenge for Miles Teg's slaughter of their members. Meanwhile, he has a replacement ghola growing for himself in Bandalong, the capital city of the Tleilaxu homeworld Tleilax.

Sequels
It is revealed in Hunters of Dune that the Honored Matres who conquered Tleilax kept several of Waff's gholas alive, but in vegetative states. In order to recover the supposedly "lost" secret to producing melange in axlotl tanks, the Lost Tleilaxu scribe Uxtal is tasked to create new gholas from Waff's genetic material. Uxtal accelerates the process artificially, and of the first batch of eight Waff gholas, seven fail to regain their memories and are viciously killed. The massacre shocks the last ghola into regaining some of Waff's memories, but not enough to recreate the melange process. Later, the Waff ghola escapes the Bene Gesserit  attack on Tleilax, finding refuge with the Spacing Guild by offering Guild Navigator Edrik the genetic knowledge for the Guild to create their own, optimized sandworms to produce melange.

In Sandworms of Dune, Waff alters the DNA of the sandworm's larval sandtrout stage to create an aquatic form of the worms, which are then released into the oceans of Buzzell. Adapting to their new environment, these "seaworms" quickly flourish, eventually producing a highly concentrated form of melange, dubbed "ultraspice". Waff makes a pilgrimage to Arrakis, original homeworld of the sandworms, and sacrifices himself to a worm, which to him is an embodiment of God.

Wellington Yueh

Dr. Wellington Yueh (10,082 A.G.−10,191 A.G.) is a Suk doctor, a highly trained physician who has been conditioned so as to be incapable of inflicting harm. He appears primarily in Frank Herbert's 1965 novel Dune, but also in the Prelude to Dune prequel trilogy (1999–2001) by Brian Herbert and Kevin J. Anderson. The character is brought back as a ghola in Hunters of Dune (2006) and Sandworms of Dune (2007), the Herbert/Anderson sequels which conclude the original series.

Yueh is portrayed by Dean Stockwell in David Lynch's 1984 film Dune, by Robert Russell in the 2000 Dune miniseries, and by Chang Chen in the 2021 Denis Villeneuve film Dune.

Dune 
As Dune begins, the decadent Baron Vladimir Harkonnen is intent on the destruction of his enemy, Duke Leto Atreides. The Harkonnen agent within the Atreides household is Leto's own physician, the trusted Dr. Yueh. Though Suk Imperial Conditioning supposedly makes the subject incapable of inflicting harm, the Baron's twisted Mentat Piter De Vries says, "It's assumed that ultimate conditioning cannot be removed without killing the subject. However, as someone once observed, given the right lever you can move a planet. We found the lever that moved the doctor." Aware of Yueh's conditioning, Leto's Mentat Thufir Hawat is assured that the doctor is not a Harkonnen spy, and Leto's Bene Gesserit concubine Lady Jessica is also fooled, noting that "[Yueh's] wife was a Bene Gesserit slain by the Harkonnens ... Haven't you heard the hate in his voice when he speaks the Harkonnen name?" The Atreides are soon attacked by Harkonnen forces on the desert planet Arrakis, and Yueh follows the Baron's orders and disables the protective shields around the Atreides palace. Yueh takes Leto prisoner, but desiring to slay the Baron in defiance of his conditioning, Yueh provides the captive Leto with a fake tooth filled with poisonous gas as a means to kill the Baron (though Leto would die as well). The Baron is holding Yueh's wife Wanna hostage, and has threatened her with interminable torture unless Yueh complies with his demands. Upon delivering Leto, Yueh confirms his belief that Wanna is already dead moments before De Vries kills him, and Leto's poison gas tooth only kills Leto and De Vries. Leto's son Paul Atreides flees into the desert with his mother, Jessica, aided by survival kits left for them by a compassionate Yueh.

Prelude to Dune
In the Prelude to Dune prequel series, a younger Baron Harkonnen consults with Yueh seeking a cure for the debilitating disease which is slowly but surely rendering him obese; Yueh is aware of no cure, but correctly suggests that the disease's source may be the Bene Gesserit. The early years of Yueh as the physician to House Atreides are also explored in the novels.

Sequels
In Hunters of Dune, set 5,000 years after Dune, Yueh is resurrected as a ghola on the no-ship Ithaca to aid in the coming final battle with mankind's "great enemy."

In Sandworms of Dune, the sequel to Hunters of Dune and finale of the original series, the young Yueh ghola is wracked by feelings of intense guilt over the actions of the "original" Yueh. Though he does not yet possess those memories, he fears that he will repeat those mistakes. A ghola's memories are restored by subjecting the ghola to an intense personal trauma, specific to each individual; Yueh's great fear of having his memories restored becomes the trigger used by the Bene Gesserit to unlock them. Now recalling how Harkonnen had broken the Suk conditioning by forcing him to watch Wanna be brutally tortured, Yueh curses the Sisterhood, saying "I have them back ... And damn you witches to hell for it." Later, Yueh kills the gestating ghola of Leto, having been tricked into believing that it was De Vries, and ultimately also kills the ghola of the Baron Harkonnen. Eleven years later, Yueh lives on the original Atreides homeworld Caladan, helping the Jessica ghola restore it to its former glory.

Notes

References